Fail Safe is a 2000 televised broadcast play, based on Fail-Safe, the Cold War novel  by Eugene Burdick and Harvey Wheeler. The play, broadcast live in black and white on CBS, starred George Clooney, Richard Dreyfuss, Harvey Keitel, and Noah Wyle, and was one of the few live dramas on American television since its Golden Age in the 1950s and 1960s. The broadcast was introduced by Walter Cronkite (his introduction, also broadcast in black and white, is included in the DVD releases of the film): it was  directed by veteran British filmmaker Stephen Frears.

The novel was first adapted into a 1964 film of the same name directed by Sidney Lumet; the TV version is shorter than the 1964 film due to commercial airtime and omits a number of subplots.

Plot
In the early-to-mid-1960s, the height of the Cold War between the United States and the Soviet Union.  An unknown aircraft approaches North America from Europe. U.S. Vindicator bombers of the Strategic Air Command (SAC) are scrambled to their fail safe points near the Russian Far East. The bombers have orders not to proceed past their fail safe points without receiving a special attack code. The original "threat" is proven to be innocuous and recall orders are issued.  However, due to a technical failure, the attack code, CAP811, is transmitted to Group Six, which consists of six Vindicator supersonic bombers and four escort fighters.  Colonel Grady, the commanding pilot of Group Six, tries to contact SAC headquarters in Omaha to verify the fail-safe order (called "Positive Check"), but due to Soviet radio jamming, Grady cannot hear Omaha.  Concluding that the attack order and the radio jamming could only mean war, Grady commands Group Six towards Moscow, their intended destination.

At meetings in Omaha, the Pentagon, and in the fallout shelter of the White House, U.S. politicians and scholars debate the implications of the attack. Professor Groteschele suggests the United States follow this accidental attack with a full-scale attack to force the Soviets to surrender.

The U.S. President orders the Air Force to send the four escort fighters after the bombers to shoot down the Vindicators. The attempt is to show that the Vindicator attack is an accident, not a full-scale nuclear assault. After using their afterburners in an attempt to catch the bombers, the fighters run out of fuel and crash, dooming the pilots to die of exposure in the Arctic Sea. The fighters fail to destroy any bombers.

The U.S. President then contacts the Premier of the Soviet Union and offers assistance in attacking the group. The Soviets decline at first; later, they decide to accept the Americans' help.

Meanwhile, the Soviet PVO Strany air defense corps has managed to shoot down two of the six planes.  After accepting American help they shoot down two more planes. Two bombers remain on course to Moscow. One is a decoy and carries no bombs. The other carries two 20 megaton devices. General Bogan tells Marshal Nevsky, the Soviet air defense commander, to ignore the decoy plane because it is harmless. Nevsky, who mistrusts Bogan, instead orders his Soviet aircraft to pursue the decoy aircraft. The Soviet fighters are then out of position to intercept the final U.S. bomber. The decoy's feint guarantees that the remaining bomber can successfully attack. Following the failure, Nevsky collapses.

As the bomber approaches Moscow, Colonel Grady opens up the radio to contact SAC to inform them that they are about to make the strike.  As a last-minute measure, the Soviets fire a barrage of nuclear-tipped missiles to form a fireball in an attempt to knock the low-flying Vindicator out of the sky.  The bomber shoots up two decoy missiles, which successfully leads the Soviet missiles high in the air and Colonel Grady's plane survives.

With the radio open, the President attempts to persuade Grady that there is no war. Grady's son also attempts to convince him. Under standing orders that such a late recall attempt must be a Soviet trick, Grady ignores them. Grady tells his crew that "We're not just walking wounded, we're walking dead men," due to radiation from the Soviet missiles. He intends to fly the aircraft over Moscow and detonate the bombs in the plane.  His co-pilot notes, "There's nothing to go home to." Meanwhile, the American president has ordered another American bomber to circle over New York with a 40-megaton payload, which should be dropped in case of the bombing of Moscow. The American ambassador in Moscow reports about the final moments of the Soviet capital before being vaporized from the blast.

The American bomber receives an order to drop its bombs over New York in order for the destruction of Moscow to be reciprocated and a Third World War avoided. It was earlier revealed that the U.S. President's wife was in New York while the events of the film transpired, meaning she would be killed in the blast. The pilot of the American bomber, General Black, commits suicide with a lethal injection just after releasing the bombs.

New Yorkers are shown going about their lives, unaware of their imminent doom. The screen fades to white, and text appears listing the 9 countries with nuclear capability as of 2000.

Cast
 Walter Cronkite as Host
 Richard Dreyfuss as The President
 Noah Wyle as Buck
 Brian Dennehy as General Bogan
 Sam Elliott as Congressman Raskob
 James Cromwell as Gordon Knapp
 John Diehl as Colonel Cascio
 Hank Azaria as Professor Groeteschele (loosely based on John von Neumann and Herman Kahn)
 Norman Lloyd as Defense Secretary Swenson
 Bill Smitrovich as General Stark
 Don Cheadle as 1st Lieutenant Jimmy Pierce
 George Clooney as Colonel Jack Grady
 Harvey Keitel as Brigadier General Warren A. Black
 Doris Belack as Mrs. Jennie Johnson
 Tommy Hinkley as Sergeant Collins
 Thom Mathews as Billy Flynn
 Cynthia Ettinger as Betty Black
 Will Rothhaar as Tom Grady (Colonel Grady's son, serving the same role in the plot as Grady's wife in the 1964 film.)

Production
The April 9, 2000 presentation was the first live broadcast of a dramatic movie (a televised play) on CBS since May 1960.  The production was shot and aired in black and white (the same format as the 1964 theatrical film), using 22 cameras on multiple sets.

See also
 List of nuclear holocaust fiction
 Nuclear weapons and the United States
 Nuclear weapons in popular culture

References

External links
 
 
 

2000 films
2000 television films
2000s thriller films
American black-and-white films
American live television shows
American political thriller films
Apocalyptic films
Black-and-white American television shows
CBS network films
Cold War aviation films
Films about fictional presidents of the United States
Films about nuclear war and weapons
Films about World War III
Films based on American novels
Films based on military novels
Films based on thriller novels
Films directed by Stephen Frears
Films set in Nebraska
Films set in New York City
Films set in Washington, D.C.
Films with screenplays by Walter Bernstein
Television remakes of films
American thriller television films
Warner Bros. films
2000s English-language films
2000s American films